= Himalaiella =

Scientific classification
- Kingdom: Plantae
- Clade: Tracheophytes
- Clade: Angiosperms
- Clade: Eudicots
- Clade: Asterids
- Order: Asterales
- Family: Asteraceae
- Genus: Himalaiella; Raab-Straube

Genus of plants

Himalaiella is a genus of flowering plants belonging to the family Asteraceae.

Its native range is Iran to China and Indo-China, Taiwan.

Species:

- Himalaiella abnormis (Lipsch.) Raab-Straube
- Himalaiella afghana (Lipsch.) Raab-Straube
- Himalaiella albescens (DC.) Raab-Straube
- Himalaiella andersonii (C.B.Clarke) D.Maity
- Himalaiella auriculata (DC.) Raab-Straube
- Himalaiella chenopodiifolia (Klatt) Raab-Straube
- Himalaiella chitralica (Duthie) Raab-Straube
- Himalaiella deltoidea (DC.) Raab-Straube
- Himalaiella foliosa (Edgew.) Raab-Straube
- Himalaiella heteromalla (D.Don) Raab-Straube
- Himalaiella hohuanshanense S.S.Ying
- Himalaiella lushaiensis Y.S.Chen & Qian Yuan
- Himalaiella natmataungensis Fujikawa
- Himalaiella nivea (DC.) Raab-Straube
- Himalaiella peguensis (C.B.Clarke) Raab-Straube
- Himalaiella qinghaiensis (S.W.Liu & T.N.Ho) Raab-Straube
- Himalaiella yakla (C.B.Clarke) Fujikawa & H.Ohba
